Richard R. Jones (September 5, 1910 – August 20, 2008) was an American politician. He served as a Republican member of the Wyoming House of Representatives and the Wyoming Senate.

Born in Montana, the son of Elsa and Alfred Jones, Jones was of Swedish descent. He attended at the Huntley Project High School, where he graduated in 1928.

After working for rail transport, Jones established his own trucking company, later called Dick Jones Trucking. He served as the mayor of Powell, Wyoming and had also served as a member of the Powell City Council. In 1955, Jones was elected to the Wyoming House of Representatives. In 1957, he left office and had served as a member of the Wyoming Senate, as President in 1967 and 1968. In 1973, Jones resigned from his office of the Wyoming Senate, in which he had decided to serve as a candidate as the Governor of Wyoming. While in the election, he was charged in Sheridan, Wyoming, in which he became unsuccessful after losing against Edgar Herschler in the gubernatorial election.

Jones died in August 2008 from complications of surgery at the Powell Hospital in Powell, Wyoming, at the age of 97.

References 

1910 births
2008 deaths
People from Billings, Montana
Democratic Party members of the Wyoming House of Representatives
Democratic Party Wyoming state senators
20th-century American politicians
Presidents of the Wyoming Senate
Mayors of places in Wyoming
American people of Swedish descent
American emigrants to Sweden
Businesspeople from Wyoming
American transportation businesspeople
American company founders